Bill Davis Racing was a racing team that participated in all three of NASCAR's top divisions until 2009.

The team had run Toyota-branded stock cars and trucks in the Camping World Truck Series (Toyota Tundra) since 2004 and Sprint Cup Series (Toyota Camry) since 2007. Dodge, Pontiac and Ford previously backed the team. The team was notable for running the No. 22 since its inception and its long relationship with Caterpillar, Inc. BDR was competitive throughout the 1990s and early 2000s with Ward Burton before fading due to an increase in competition and a fallout with manufacturer Dodge. The team was sold to Triad Racing Technologies in late 2008, which shut down the team's racing entries and now produces engines and chassis for various Toyota NASCAR teams.

Beginnings
BDR was formed by then-truck rental owner Bill Davis, who himself was a former motocross racer. Davis helped his friend and business partner Julian Martin develop his son Mark's ASA racing program. When Martin signed with J. D. Stacy, Davis took a break from racing, but returned to hire Martin to drive his Busch Series car for 15 races with sponsorship from Carolina Ford Dealers. In 1990, Davis moved the team to High Point, North Carolina, while his wife Gail stayed in Arkansas to oversee the trucking operation.

Sprint Cup Series

Car No. 22 history

Bobby Labonte (1993–1994)
Upon arriving in Carolina, Davis was asked by Ford to hire up-and-coming Midwest driver Jeff Gordon, who won the NASCAR Busch Series Rookie of the Year in 1991 and won eleven pole positions the next year. Davis was hoping to move him and crew chief Ray Evernham to the Winston Cup Series, but they were lured away by Rick Hendrick. Davis still moved up to the Cup Series full-time in 1993 however, with 1991 Busch Series champion Bobby Labonte, who finished 2nd to Gordon for Winston Cup Rookie of the Year driving the No. 22 Maxwell House-sponsored Ford. The team switched to Pontiac the following season. After 1994, Labonte left to drive for Joe Gibbs Racing. MBNA replaced Maxwell House as the sponsor.

Randy LaJoie (1995)
Originally, Davis went with another rookie — Busch Series standout Randy LaJoie — to drive the car. Midway through the year, LaJoie was fired from the team and replaced by a series of rotating drivers including Wally Dallenbach Jr., who finished second at Watkins Glen. Finally, Ward Burton was hired to finish out the year. He scored the team's first win at North Carolina Motor Speedway in late 1995.

Ward Burton (1995–2003)
With Burton driving, the No. 22 team slowly began to improve, despite not winning any races. In 1998, the No. 22 team cracked the top ten in the final Winston Cup points standings and matched those results in 1999 (by which time Caterpillar, Inc. was their sponsor) and in 2000, when the team finally returned to victory lane at the spring Darlington race. Burton's second career win was team's last victory in a Pontiac as they joined several teams in switching to Dodge Intrepids for the following season.

Burton returned to victory lane the following season, winning the 2001 Southern 500. This would become Dodge's second win since returning to NASCAR, but the team's streak of consecutive top ten points finishes was broken at three, as the No. 22 finished fourteenth. Burton added 2 more wins in 2002, scoring a victory in the Daytona 500 (Dodge's first Daytona 500 win in twenty-eight years) and later in the year at the New England 300 at New Hampshire, but a series of inconsistent finishes dropped the team to twenty-fifth place in the points standings. Burton's win at New Hampshire, in addition to being his last win in the Cup series, was also BDR's last in Cup racing (although they won races in other series before folding).

Scott Wimmer (2003–2005)
The team's struggles continued in the 2003 season, and with four races left in the season Burton, who had already signed on to drive the No. 0 for Haas CNC Racing the following season, departed for that team and was replaced with Davis's Busch driver Scott Wimmer, who raced full-time in 2004 and finished third in the first race of his rookie season. In late-2005, BDR announced it would part ways with Wimmer at the end of the year.

Dave Blaney (2006–2008)
Dave Blaney, who previously drove the No. 93 for BDR, was hired to drive the No. 22 beginning with the 2006 season. He had two top tens and finished twenty-sixth in the points standings. In 2007, the team switched to Toyota. Blaney won the pole for the 2007 Lenox Industrial Tools 300 at New Hampshire, making this the first pole for Toyota in the Sprint Cup Series. Blaney scored his first top ten with Toyota at Indianapolis Motor Speedway on July 29 and later that season, he finished third at Talladega, the best finish of any Toyota in 2007. Additionally, Blaney was the only Toyota driver in the top thirty-five in owner points after the 2007 season. The team had a rough start to the 2008 season, as they missed the Aaron's 499 which was a hard hit for the team. They returned the next week at Richmond to finish in eighteenth. The following week at Darlington, they finished ninth, scoring their best of the year. In June of that year, Caterpillar announced that it would leave the No. 22 Bill Davis Racing Toyota to sponsor the Richard Childress Racing's No. 31 car, starting in 2009. On December 22, 2008, it was announced that Bill Davis sold majority ownership of his NASCAR teams to Mike Held, a California businessman, and Marty Gaunt, an executive with BDR. That same day, Gaunt and Held announced that they would also be buying into Triad Racing Technologies. Blaney would leave TRT to drive for Prism Motorsports, and Penske Racing would buy the owners points of the No. 22 and transfer them to the No. 77 of Sam Hornish Jr. The addition of Davis would change the team name to Penske Championship Racing.

Car No. 22 results

Car No. 27 history
Dave Blaney (2000–2001)
The second full-time team made its debut in Winston Cup as the No. 93 with an Amoco sponsorship in 2000, with Dave Blaney driving. Despite failing to qualify at the spring Rockingham race, Blaney finished 3rd in the Rookie of the year standings. The team flirted with victory lane a few times in 2001, but Amoco decided not to renew its contract, and Blaney left for Jasper Motorsports.

Hut Stricklin (2002)
The car returned for the 2002 season with a new sponsor, number and driver. Hut Stricklin moved over from Donlavey Racing and brought sponsorship from Hills Brothers Coffee with him. Stricklin started off 2002 by failing to qualify for the Daytona 500 and was inconsistent for much of the season. He recorded five top twenty finishes, but also finished 35th or worse 6 times and did not even attempt the race at Watkins Glen. Stricklin left the team after the Sharpie 500 at Bristol, and Hills Brothers announced they would be pulling sponsorship.

Kenny Wallace (2002–03)
Around this time, there was another driver looking for a full time ride that had a sponsor ready to back him. Kenny Wallace had not raced a full season in Cup since Andy Petree released him following the 2000 season and who had started the year as an injury substitute for Steve Park at Dale Earnhardt, Inc., but had been running the #48 Stacker 2 Chevrolet for Innovative Motorsports. Wallace also appeared as a pitchman for the supplement.
With Davis needing a sponsor and Wallace needing a car to drive, the two sides worked out a deal. Wallace would begin driving the #23 immediately and Hills Brothers would continue to serve as sponsor. Then, beginning the following season, the #23 would carry Stacker 2 as its primary sponsor.

Wallace ran at the Southern 500 and nine other races in the #23 to close out the year. He missed the Old Dominion 500 at Martinsville due to conflicts with the Busch race weekend at Memphis Motorsports Park, and he had already agreed to run the EA Sports 500 at Talladega Superspeedway for Andy Petree in conjunction with a promotion by AT&T. In those ten starts, Wallace's best finish was eleventh at Phoenix. Scott Wimmer and Geoffrey Bodine ran the #23 in the other two events, with Wimmer recording a 17th-place finish at Talladega.

Wallace ran all 36 races in 2003 with one top ten finish, which he recorded at Bristol. After the season, BDR moved Wallace and Stacker 2 to the Busch Series full-time to replace Wimmer, who was promoted to Cup racing. Following the year, Davis shut down his second-full time operation.

Part-time (2004–05)
Dave Blaney made several starts for the team in 2004, including the Daytona 500. In 2004 and 2005 the car ran mostly unsponsored, with a couple of drivers running selected events. Shane Hmiel, Tony Raines, and Blaney ran the car in 2004. Mike Skinner ran six events in 2005.

Michael Waltrip (2006)
In the fall of 2005, it was announced that the team would return to full-time competition as the No. 55 car in 2006 with Michael Waltrip driving and NAPA sponsoring. Plans changed, however, in January 2006, when it was announced that Jasper Motorsports owner Doug Bawel would sell the owner's points of his No. 77 team to Waltrip and Davis to form Waltrip-Jasper Racing. Although this helped the No. 55 get into the first five races of 2006, it did not help the team, as BDR's expansion was painful and occurred without Dodge support, with Waltrip failing to qualify several times and failing to finish in the top 35 in points. The Waltrip-Jasper name was later dropped mid-season, as Bawel was never truly involved with the racing operations. With Waltrip starting his own Toyota team in 2007, and BDR also switching to Toyota, Waltrip took the points with him to MWR.

Jeremy Mayfield (2007)
Jeremy Mayfield was hired drive the car full-time in 2007, with the car renumbered No. 36 for a new sponsorship from 360 OTC. Due to Waltrip taking the team's points, Mayfield needed to qualify on time for the first five races of 2007. After four consecutive failed qualifying attempts, the No. 36 car made its first start of 2007 in the Food City 500 at Bristol. Mayfield drove the car at every track except for Infineon Raceway, when the team did not enter but the R&D team used the No. 36 points. In October, Mayfield departed to Haas CNC Racing, and was replaced by Skinner and Benson for the balance of the season.

Jacques Villeneuve (2008)
The car was then scheduled to continue full-time racing, once again in a renumbered car. Jacques Villeneuve planned to drive the No. 27 in 2008, but the deal fell through after sponsorship could not be found. Benson and Skinner were hired to take over in the interim, before the team folded four races into the season after continued financial difficulties.

Car No. 27 results

R&D Car history
Bill Davis fielded a third part-time team for R&D purposes on numerous occasions. This car switched numerous times between No. 23 and No. 27. .

The No. 23 car made its debut at the season finale NAPA 500 in 2000 with Scott Wimmer driving the No. 23 AT&T sponsored Pontiac.

In 2001, the car once again did not appear until the final Atlanta race of the year. There, Hut Stricklin, preparing for his 2002 ride with the team, raced to an impressive 11th-place finish.

The following year, Stricklin and the No. 23 car moved to the full-time spot, while the R&D car was renumbered to No. 27. Wimmer returned to the team, attempting seven races. He qualifies for two races, finishing neither.

For the 2003 season, the third BDR team experimented with manufacturers, running Chevrolets as opposed to the standard Dodges. Wimmer attempting three starts for the team before switching taking over for Ward Burton in the No. 22. In the fall Atlanta race, Shelby Howard made his only Cup attempt, failing to qualify. The R&D team merged with the second full-time team in for 2004-05 as Davis scaled back to a two car operation.

With Michael Waltrip reviving the second full time team in the 2006 season, the No. 23 returned running as the third team for Davis. Mike Skinner failed to qualify for the 2006 Daytona 500, but Bill Lester became the first African-American since Willy T. Ribbs to compete in a Cup race at the Golden Corral 500. He started nineteenth and finished thirty-ninth. Lester attempted two more races that season, finishing thirty-second at Michigan International Speedway, but failing to qualify at California Speedway.

The No. 23 car attempted the Daytona 500 in 2007 with Mike Skinner, but did not qualify. Veteran road racing specialist Butch Leitzinger ran the No. 23 car with special CAT sponsorship at Infineon Raceway. In the later stages of 2007, the renumbered No. 27 made the UAW-Ford 500 and the Checker Auto Parts 500 with Jacques Villeneuve driving.

Busch Series 
Mark Martin (1988–1990)
BDR began fielding cars in the Busch Series in 1988, when Mark Martin drove thirteen races in the No. 06 Carolina Ford Dealers Ford, posting two top-tens and one win. The team switched to No. 1 the following season with Martin continuing to drive winning the spring race at Bristol. Geoff Bodine ran one race at Martinsville in the fall. Martin won one race at Mytrle Beach in 1990 running twelve races.

Jeff Gordon (1991–1992)
In 1991, the team went full-time with a young Jeff Gordon. Although he did not win, and even failed to qualify for the Goody's 300, he had five top fives, taking Rookie of the Year honors and an 11th place points position. Martin ran in a second car at Hickory in the spring. Baby Ruth became the main sponsor in 1992 with Gordon winning three races including the spring race at Atlanta where Rick Hendrick took notice of Gordon's talents. Gordon and the team were going to move up to the Winston Cup in 1993 but Gordon signed with Hendrick.

Dave Blaney (1998–1999)
In 1998, the team returned full-time fielding the No. 93 Amoco Pontiac piloted by sprint car ace Dave Blaney. Running a limited schedule, Blaney finished in 6th place 3 times. Blaney had an even better 1999 season, winning the pole position several times and finished eighth in points. That same year, Davis fielded a second car for Burton, the No. 02 sponsored by Polaris. He finished in the top-ten in every race and won a pole at Darlington.

Mike Borkowski (2000)
In 2000, Davis opened the No. 20 ride sponsored by AT&T. Rookie Mike Borkowski started the year in the ride, but after the Busch 200, he was released. Dave Blaney and Tom Hubert shared the ride for the year before Scott Wimmer took over in the final part of the season. Burton's team changed to the No. 22 and had two top-five finishes, then closed up.

Scott Wimmer (2000–2003)
Wimmer took over the No. 20, renumbered the No. 23, for 2001, posting eight top-tens and finishing eleventh in points in a Jani-King sponsored car. Siemens became a part-time sponsor in 2002, but the team threatened to shut down to a lack of finances. However, it remained open, and Wimmer won four races in the second half of the season, finishing 3rd in points. For 2003, Stacker 2 came on board as  sponsor, and he picked up a win at Pikes Peak.

Kenny Wallace (2004)
At the end of the season, Wimmer moved to Cup, and Kenny Wallace took his place, posting ten top-ten finishes and finishing ninth in points. After Wallace and Stacker 2 left for ppc Racing, Davis sold the equipment to Keith Coleman Racing. The team still remained involved in Busch supplying engines to MacDonald Motorsports.

Busch Series Results

Craftsman Truck Series

Truck No. 5 history 
Mike Skinner (2004–2008)

The No. 5 truck started out in 2004 at Bang! Racing as the No. 42 driven by Mike Skinner. Skinner started the year with two top-fives, but his performance began to decline, and his team was sold to Davis, changing to the No. 5, starting at the Las Vegas 350. He won two poles and had a sixth-place run at the season-ending race at Homestead-Miami Speedway. In 2005, he won seven poles and two races, at Bristol and Richmond respectively, finishing fifth in points. In 2006, he had thirteen top-tens including a win at Las Vegas Motor Speedway, and almost won the 2007 championship before suffering tire failures in the season finale. Skinner was signed to drive for TRT through the 2009 season. However, due to concerns over the economy, the team shut down the entire truck program, with Skinner taking the number 5 with him to Randy Moss Motorsports.

Truck No. 22 history 
Bill Lester (2004–2006)
BDR's original foray into the Truck Series, it debuted in 2004 at the Florida Dodge Dealers 250, where Bill Lester drove it to a sixteenth-place run. He posted just one top-ten that year and finished 22nd in points. The next season, he won two poles (back-to-back at Kansas and Kentucky), had a best finish of fifth and moved up to seventeenth in points. Lester failed to finish in the top-ten during the 2006 season and dropped to twentieth in points.

Tyler Walker and Ryan Matthews (2007)
Tyler Walker began the season driving the renumbered No. 36 truck full-time in 2007, with sponsorship from 360 OTC. Six races into the season, rookie Ryan Mathews replaced Walker after it was learned that Walker was suspended for violating NASCAR's substance abuse policy, and the team had lost its sponsor, 360 OTC (which wanted No. 36). Mathews, in his short season, posted two top tens, one top five, and one pole at Kentucky Speedway. Mathews then stepped out of the truck for the debut of 1995 Indianapolis 500 winner and 1997 Formula One Champion Jacques Villeneuve. In preparation for this, the truck was renumbered No. 27, which Villeneuve used in his 1995 CART and Indy 500 championship season, as a tribute to his father Gilles.

Phillip McGilton, Scott Speed and Michael Annett (2008)
The Truck switched back to the No. 22 in 2008 and began the year with Phillip McGilton as the driver, before he was replaced by Scott Speed and Michael Annett. The team had the most successful season 2008, with Speed winning his first NASCAR victory at Dover, and Annett scoring two top-tens in seven races. This team was shut down after the 2008 season due to economic concerns.

Truck No. 23 history 
Shelby Howard (2004)

The No. 23 truck began in 2004 when Davis purchased its equipment from Phil Bonifield. The truck was piloted by Shelby Howard. Howard ran eight races before he was released, and Johnny Benson Jr. took over.

Johnny Benson (2004–2008)
Despite running a limited schedule, Benson finished 25th in points. He became the full-time driver in 2005, and had six top-fives en route to a tenth-place points finish. Benson went on to collect five wins during the 2006 season with additional backing from Exide Batteries and finished runner-up to Todd Bodine for the championship. 360 OTC sponsored the 23 for ten races during the 2007 season. Benson won four races and finished third in points. In 2008 Benson was considered a title favorite. Benson and crew chief Trip Bruce won five races that year and held off defending champion Ron Hornaday Jr. to win the 2008 NASCAR Craftsman Truck Series championship, the first ever NASCAR championship for BDR.  Before winning the championship, it was announced that Benson would not return in 2009. Both Benson and Trip Bruce have since been named to the No. 1 truck of Red Horse Racing. ARCA RE/MAX Series driver Tayler Malsam was intended to drive this truck for Rookie of the Year Honors, but he later moved to Randy Moss Motorsports with Skinner after the abrupt closure of Bill Davis Racing.

Truck No. 24 history 
The No. 24 truck entered as a research and development entry for BDR in 2005. Steve Park drove the No. 67 South Padre Island entry in a pair of races towards the end of the year following his release from Orleans Racing. His best finish was 16th at Texas. In 2006, A. J. Allmendinger drove the newly renumbered 24 for three races, posting a fifth-place run at Talladega Superspeedway. ARCA Re/MAX Series driver Phillip McGilton was to make his NASCAR debut in this truck at Homestead-Miami Speedway before going full-time with the No. 22 team in 2008, however plans were changed as Blaney was put in the No. 22 truck sponsored by Caterpillar. This truck has made only one start, which came at the 2008 Ford 200 with Tayler Malsam driving to a 21st-place finish. This team was also shut down after the 2008 season concluded.

Controversy

Fallout with Dodge
In 2003, Dodge parent company DaimlerChrysler filed a lawsuit against Bill Davis Racing after they "found the race team to be building (Truck Series) trucks for Toyota," in preparation for entering the Truck Series in 2004. In addition, BDR continued to run Pontiacs in the Busch Series through 2002, and Chevrolets in 2003 and 2004 due to Dodge not giving any manufacturer support in the Busch Series. Bill Davis Racing had built a prototype for Toyota's Truck program to present to NASCAR, which Chrysler viewed as a breach of contract. Dodge proceeded to pull manufacturer support from BDR in October 2003. The team continued to run Dodges through 2006; they stopped running Dodge logos on the cars that year after a District Court judge in Detroit ruled in favor of DaimlerChrysler, requiring Davis to pay $6.5 million to the manufacturer in February 2006. Davis switched to Toyota in the Sprint Cup Series in 2007. Although there was a ruling against the team, Davis and Dodge settled out-of-court in November 2006, with the terms not released.

References

External links 
 
 
 Car 22 news
 Car 23 news
 Car 27 news
 Bill Davis Racing News

American auto racing teams
High Point, North Carolina
Defunct NASCAR teams
ARCA Menards Series teams
Defunct companies based in North Carolina
Auto racing teams established in 1989
Auto racing teams disestablished in 2009
Sports in the Piedmont Triad

de:Bill Davis Racing
fr:Bill Davis Racing